The Roman Catholic Metropolitan Archdiocese of Portoviejo is an archdiocese located in the city of Portoviejo in Ecuador.

Special churches
Minor Basilicas:
Basílica de Santísima Virgen de Monserrat in Montecristi(Basilica of the Holy Virgin of Montserrat)

Bishops

Ordinaries
Bishops of Portoviejo
Luis Tola y Avilés (6 Mar 1871 – 1881)
Pedro Schumacher, C.M. (27 Mar 1885 – 15 Jul 1900)
Juan María Riera, O.P. (16 Dec 1907 – 19 Jan 1912), appointed Bishop of Guayaquil
Nicanor Carlos Gavinales Chamorro (30 May 1947 – 17 Feb 1967)
Luis Alfredo Carvajal Rosales (17 Feb 1967 – 6 Aug 1989)
José Mario Ruiz Navas (6 Aug 1989 – 25 February 1994); see below
Archbishops of Portoviejo
José Mario Ruiz Navas (25 February 1994 – 6 Aug 2007); see above
Lorenzo Voltolini Esti (6 Aug 2007 – 14 Sept 2018)
Eduardo José Castillo Pino (2 Oct 2019–present)

Coadjutor bishop
Luis Alfredo Carvajal Rosales  (1963-1967)

Auxiliary bishops
Luis Alfredo Carvajal Rosales  (1955-1963), appointed Coadjutor here
Francisco Ovidio Vera Intriago (1992-2014)
Lorenzo Voltolini Esti (1993-2007), appointed Archbishop here
Eduardo José Castillo Pino (2012-2019), appointed Archbishop here
 Vicente Horacio Saeteros Sierra (2020-

Suffragan dioceses
 Diocese of Santo Domingo in Ecuador

See also
Roman Catholicism in Ecuador

Sources

 GCatholic.org
 Catholic Hierarchy
 Diocese website 

Roman Catholic dioceses in Ecuador
Roman Catholic Ecclesiastical Province of Portoviejo
Religious organizations established in 1870
Roman Catholic dioceses and prelatures established in the 19th century